Mucins are a family of high molecular weight, heavily glycosylated proteins (glycoconjugates) produced by epithelial tissues in most animals. Mucins' key characteristic is their ability to form gels; therefore they are a key component in most gel-like secretions, serving functions from lubrication to cell signalling to forming chemical barriers. They often take an inhibitory role. Some mucins are associated with controlling mineralization, including nacre formation in mollusks, calcification in echinoderms and bone formation in vertebrates. They bind to pathogens as part of the immune system. Overexpression of the mucin proteins, especially MUC1, is associated with many types of cancer.

Although some mucins are membrane-bound due to the presence of a hydrophobic membrane-spanning domain that favors retention in the plasma membrane, most mucins are secreted as principal components of mucus by mucous membranes or are secreted to become a component of saliva.

Genes
Human mucins include genes with the HUGO symbol MUC 1 through 22. Of these mucins, the following classes have been defined by localization:

 Secreted mucins: 
 Gel-forming mucins: MUC2, MUC5AC, MUC5B, MUC6, MUC19
 Non-gel-forming (soluble) mucins: MUC7 (non-oligomerizing), MUC8, MUC9, MUC20
 Membrane-bound (transmembrane) mucins: MUC1, MUC3A, MUC3B, MUC4, MUC12, MUC13, MUC15, MUC16, MUC17, MUC21 (formerly C6orf205), MUC22 (highly polymorphic)

The major secreted airway mucins are MUC5AC and MUC5B, while MUC2 is secreted mostly in the intestine but also in the airway. MUC7 is the major salivary protein.

Protein structure
Mature mammalian mucins are composed of two distinct regions:

 The amino- and carboxy-terminal regions are very lightly glycosylated, but rich in cysteines. The cysteine residues participate in establishing disulfide linkages within and among mucin monomers.
 A large central region ("PTS domain") formed of multiple tandem repeats of 10 to 80 residue sequences in which up to half of the amino acids are serine or threonine. This area becomes saturated with hundreds of O-linked oligosaccharides. N-linked oligosaccharides are also found on mucins, but in less abundance than O-linked sugars.

Evolutionary classification 
The functional classification does not correspond to an exact evolutionary relationship, which is still incomplete and ongoing. Known-related groups include:

 The gel-forming mucins (2, 5AC, 5B, 6, 19) are related both to each other and to otogelin and von Willebrand Factor (PTHR11339). Four of these occur in a well-conserved gene cluster (at 11p.15.5 in humans).
 The EGF-like domain containing mucins. These include MUC3(A,B), MUC4, MUC12, MUC13, and MUC17.
 Some EGF-like mucins, plus MUC1 and MUC16, carry SEA domains, a vertebrate invention. It is unclear whether this points to a common origin among these transmembrane mucins.
 MUC21 and MUC22 are related to each other by sharing a C-terminal domain (PF14654). They also occur in a human gene cluster on 6p21.33.
 MUC7 is a recent invention in placental mammals. It started as a copy in the secretory calcium-binding phosphoprotein (SCPP) gene cluster and rapidly gained PTS repeats.

Function in humans 
Mucins have been found to have important functions in defense against bacterial and fungal infections. MUC5B, the predominant mucin in the mouth and female genital tract, has been shown to significantly reduce attachment and biofilm formation of Streptococcus mutans, a bacterium with the potential to form cavities. Unusually, MUC5B does not kill the bacteria but rather maintains it in the planktonic (non-biofilm) phase, thus maintaining a diverse and healthy oral microbiome. Similar effects of MUC5B and other mucins have been demonstrated with other pathogens, such as Candida albicans, Helicobacter pylori, and even HIV. In the mouth, mucins can also recruit anti-microbial proteins such as statherins and histatine 1, which further reduces risk of infection.

Glycosylation and aggregation
Mucin genes encode mucin monomers that are synthesized as rod-shaped apomucin cores that are post-translationally modified by exceptionally abundant glycosylation.

The dense "sugar coating" of mucins gives them considerable water-holding capacity and also makes them resistant to proteolysis, which may be important in maintaining mucosal barriers.

Mucins are secreted as massive aggregates of proteins with molecular masses of roughly 1 to 10 million Da. Within these aggregates, monomers are linked to one another mostly by non-covalent interactions, although intermolecular disulfide bonds may also play a role in this process.

Secretion
Upon stimulation, MARCKS (myristylated alanine-rich C kinase substrate) protein coordinates the secretion of mucin from mucin-filled vesicles within the specialized epithelial cells. Fusion of the vesicles to the plasma membrane causes release of the mucin, which as it exchanges Ca2+ for Na+ expands up to 600 fold. The result is a viscoelastic product of interwoven molecules which, combined with other secretions (e.g., from the airway epithelium and the submucosal glands in the respiratory system), is called mucus.

Clinical significance
Increased mucin production occurs in many adenocarcinomas, including cancers of the pancreas, lung, breast, ovary, colon and other tissues. Mucins are also overexpressed in lung diseases such as asthma, bronchitis, chronic obstructive pulmonary disease (COPD) or cystic fibrosis. Two membrane mucins, MUC1 and MUC4 have been extensively studied in relation to their pathological implication in the disease process. Mucins are under investigation as possible diagnostic markers for malignancies and other disease processes in which they are most commonly over- or mis-expressed.

Abnormal deposits of mucin are responsible for the non-pitting facial edema seen in untreated hypothyroidism. This edema is seen in the pretibial area as well.

Non-vertebrate mucins 
Beyond the better-studied vertebrate mucins, other animals also express (not necessarily related) proteins with similar properties. These include:

 Drosophila is known to express mucin proteins containing PTS-rich repeats.
 Trypanosoma cruzi express cell-surface mucins (PF01456).

See also 
 Bovine submaxillary mucin coatings
 Verotoxin-producing Escherichia coli

References

Further reading

External links 
 

Glycoproteins